Olivier Martinez may refer to:

 Olivier Martinez, French actor
 Olivier Martinez (footballer), French footballer

See also 

 Olivier Martinet, French architect